The Bastard Sword is a 2018 medieval fantasy adventure film written and directed by Eveshka Ghost. It stars Xander Phillips, Seth Easterbrook and Martyn Eade.

The Bastard Sword had a modest theatrical opening and received mostly positive reviews.

Plot 
A fighter named Tias is searching for a magical sword to help his friends widow from despair. However he is not the only one searching for it. A Thief named Mars desires the sword for less honourable means. Together they must form an unlikely alliance and seek the help from a mysterious hermit who is the only one who knows where it is.

However the sword can only be claimed by one of them.

Cast 

 Xander Phillips as Tias, A "farmboy" turned fighter and main protagonist of the story.
 Martyn Eade as Mars, A thief and the main antagonist of the story.
 Seth Easterbrook as Ulysses , A mysterious hermit in the forest.
 Danielle Thorpe as Nyx, a pixie and friend of Ulysses.
 Chris Wilson as Viktor, Mars's right hand man and fellow Thief.
 James McClusky as Lars, one of Mars's men and the youngest of their pack.
Gemma Comber as Liliya. Liliya is a mourning over the loss of her lover and is the reason Tias wants the power of the sword.
Chris Comber as Nikolai, He is the love interest of Liliya and friend of Tias.

Production

Development 
Eveshka mentioned that during writing the script, The Bastard Sword was meant to be a drama that was set in a fantasy world; and was written purely to be doable film with limited means. The more drama that could be created, the less reliability there would be on special effects, armies and "general wallet-busting elements".

Eveshka also mentions that the three main characters come from influence of point-and-click adventure games, most prominently Quest For Glory with each of the three classes Fighter, Thief and Magic User echoing that of Tias, Mars and Ulysses respectively.

The Director of the film Eveshka Ghost wrote the script for The Bastard Sword, whilst finishing up on his previous film "The Granary". The tagline "A Grande Adventure" actually came from a joke between him and Phillips whilst filming some of the final scenes. Xander Recalls:"We had just finished The Granary and Ghost and I were finishing off the “Knight scenes.”

The two of us were taking some pictures of the knight costume whilst we still had the opportunity.

Whilst Eveshka was lighting me up I took of my helmet and extended my arm like I was performing a dramatic Shakespearean play and I said in an old medieval accent

"Make me look like a grande warrior."

Ghost started laughing and he said "What The Hell Is a Grande Warrior?"

To which I responded "I don't know but make me look like one."

Ghost continued to chuckle whilst taking the photographs and he finally said "Is it original? You didn't steal it from anywhere did you?"

"I said no not at all It just came off the tongue I thought it fit".

Later on after the photoshoot Ghost and I kept giggling and he said "If it's definitely original I think I know where we can use that."

I said "Yeah?"

Ghost then said "The thing is I've had this idea for a script i'm writing called The Bastard Sword, it's going to be a medieval fantasy and there's going to be a bad guy called (he scruffs up his face) Mars".Ghost's original ending of the film differed significantly in the script. The initial story focuses more on the relationship between Ulysses and Nyx rather than Ulysses and Tias. However the true ending is still a secret known only by those who had the script.

Filming and Post Production 
Principal photography began during the summer of 2016 and took a total of 23 sessions to film. Interior footage was built by Easterbrook in a private location in West Sussex. While location shooting took place in a mixture of a private location and in Ashdown Forest; which is more famously known for the setting of A.A Milne's .Winnie The Pooh Novels.

The budget was extremely minimal, so minimal that the cinema licence had to be paid for via a kickstarter campaign. The film cost approximately £2000 and made £3660 all of which was put towards its release.

Audio was dubbed completely to save time and took two years to complete in post production.

Soundtrack 
The film score was written by Eveshka Ghost and created a score over two hours long in order to showcase more of a musical presence on the film than as a filmmaker.

"I'm a classical pianist, so I always like classical traditional scores. Although this time, I made the personal rule of having no piano in the film, not a single note. This would create a new challenge, forcing me to orchestrate everything and learn more about the orchestra itself. Writing piano music is far, far easier for me as I can just sit there and play it, but orchestrating and trying to make a digital orchestra sound relatively convincing on a budget is a major challenge. I would LOVE one day to work with a real orchestra."

Eclectic influences on the score include John Williams and James Horner, as well as John Barry and James Newton Howard.

 Track listing

Disc 1
 "Opening Fanfare / Fool's Gold" 10:10
 "Ancient Relic / Ulysses" 6:59
 "My House, My Rules" 4:16
 "A Visitor" 1:30
 "Lady of the Mist" 5:04
 "Folk Tale" 2:03
 "The Enchanted Lake" 1:44
 "We'll Share It" 5:01
 "Demons of the Night" 0:38
 "The Quest" 2:35
 "The Grim Forest" 6:14
 "Digging The Spot" 1:16
 "Viktor" 3:24
 "A Quarter of a Third" 2:55
 "A Real Grande Warrior" 14:28
Disc 2
 "Temptation of the Sword" 1:48
 "Clever Tricks" 3:39
 "Never Leave the Forest" 2:36
 "A False Sword / The Better Man" 15:54
 "Remember You Shall" 18:15
 "My Time Will Come" 17:20
 "End Titles" 2:34

Release and Awards 
The Bastard Sword won four international awards and had a modest cinema run in the United Kingdom.

It released on Home Video around the world in late 2018. This included DVD, Blu-Ray, Digital, and a limited edition collectors VHS.

References

External links 

 
The Bastard Sword on Rotten Tomatoes
The Bastard Sword on Shot on What?

British fantasy adventure films
2010s fantasy adventure films
British independent films
2018 films
2010s English-language films
2010s British films